Victim in Pain is the debut full-length studio album by New York hardcore punk band Agnostic Front. It was released in 1984 on Rat Cage Records and follows the United Blood EP. The album features Rob Kabula and Dave Jones, who replaced Adam Mucci and Raybeez on bass and drums respectively.  It is still available as a split album with their subsequent album, 1986's Cause for Alarm.

Tributes
Richard Bruinen (nicknamed Richie Backfire), drummer of the Dutch band Backfire!, had "Victim in Pain" tattooed on his stomach. After his 1999 suicide, Agnostic Front dedicated the song "Bullet on Mott St." to him.
Fear Factory, along with Freddy Cricien, Roger Miret's younger brother, covered "Your Mistake" on the Demanufacture limited edition release.
Pro-Pain covered "Your Mistake" on their 2003 release Run for Cover.
Hatebreed also covered "Your Mistake" on their 2009 release For the Lions.
F-Minus covered "Victim in Pain" on their 2005 release Won't Bleed Me / Failed Society.
Philip H. Anselmo and the Illegals covered the song "United and Strong" throughout their summer 2013.
Grindcore band Napalm Death covered "Blind Justice" on their 2004 covers album Leaders Not Followers: Part 2.
Crossover band Stormtroopers of Death covered "United and Strong" on the 2007 album "Rise of the Infidels".
Biohazard covered "Power" on their 1999 maxi single "Switchback".

Album cover
The album cover features the famous photograph The Last Jew in Vinnitsa.

Track listing

Personnel
Agnostic Front
 Roger Miret – vocals
 Vinnie Stigma – guitars
 Rob Kabula – bass
 Dave Jones – drums

Production
 Recorded at Demo Studios in New York City
 Produced and mixed by Don Fury

External links
Discogs album entry
Flex! Discography album entry
Agnostic Front official website

1984 debut albums
Agnostic Front albums
Albums produced by Don Fury